Bantu Mwaura was a Kenyan performing artist, director, playwright, storyteller, poet and university lecturer. He was also a political and human rights activist and a cultural theorist who has worked mostly with civil society using theatre and performance in human rights and developmental work.

Bantu's poetry has been published in several journals and anthologies in English, Swahili and Gikuyu. He has been commissioned by organisations such as the World Council of Churches and the World Social Forum to write and perform poetry in international fora, performing poetry and spoken word in Europe, the United States and several countries in Africa. In Kenya, Bantu appeared in the monthly poetry slams organised by Kwani?, the leading East-African based literary magazine. Bantu was part of the Poetry Africa programme at the World Social Forum in Nairobi in 2007. He has taught poetry, storytelling and playwriting in different universities in Kenya and the United States and his plays have been performed in Kenya, Zimbabwe, the US and the UK.

Bantu's poetry focused mainly on social and political issues, examining how society is ordered and how socio-economic and political issues impact on the advancement of society at large. In doing so his poetry was principally concerned with examining the African continent, its politics, its history and its place in the international arena.

Bantu undertook his PhD in Performance Studies at the New York University and also had a master's degree in Theatre Studies from Leeds University (UK) and another Masters in African-American and African Studies from the Ohio State University (US). His research was largely focused on examining how performance theory interfaces with theatre practice in Africa, how culture impacts and has been impacted upon by real politics, and on the politics of performance space.

Bantu was also the founding editor and editor-inchief of Jahazi – a journal on the arts, culture and performance.

He left behind a widow Susan and two daughters.

References 
Text adapted with permission from Poetry Africa Website 
The Standard, April 27, 2009: Human rights activist Bantu Mwaura found dead

Kenyan human rights activists
Kenyan poets
2009 deaths
Year of birth missing